Henri Frédéric Amiel (27 September 1821 – 11 May 1881) was a Swiss moral philosopher, poet, and critic.

Biography
Born in Geneva in 1821, Amiel was descended from a Huguenot family that moved to Switzerland following the revocation of the Edict of Nantes.

After losing his parents at an early age, Amiel travelled widely, became intimate with the intellectual leaders of Europe, and made a special study of German philosophy in Berlin. In 1849 he was appointed professor of aesthetics at the academy of Geneva, and in 1854 became professor of moral philosophy.

These appointments, conferred by the democratic party, deprived him of the support of the aristocratic party, whose patronage dominated all the culture of the city.  This isolation inspired the one book by which Amiel is still known, the Journal Intime ("Private Journal"), which, published after his death, obtained a European reputation.  It was translated into English by British writer Mary Augusta Ward at the suggestion of academic Mark Pattison.

Although modest in volume of output, Amiel's Journal gained a sympathy that the author had failed to obtain in his life. In addition to the Journal, he produced several volumes of poetry and wrote studies on Erasmus, Madame de Stael and other writers. His extensive correspondence with Égérie, his muse name for Louise Wyder, was preserved and published in 2004.

He died in Geneva on 11 May 1881, at the age of 59.

The French philosopher Ludovic Dugas, in trying to describe a new psychological phenomenon, took the word depersonalization from an entry in his Journal intime, "Everything is strange to me, I can be outside of my body, of me as an individual, I am depersonalized, detached, away". Dugas took this as a literal description, but a few paragraphs later Amiel clarifies: "it seems to me that these mental experiences (transformations mentales) are no more than philosophical experiences. I am not committed to any one in particular".

Works 
 Berlin au printemps de l’année 1848 (1849)
 Du mouvement littéraire dans la Suisse romane et de son avenir (1849)
 Grains de mil (1854)
 Il penseroso (1858)
 La Cloche (1860)
 La Part du rêve (1863)
 L’Escalade de MDCII (1875)
 Charles le Téméraire (1876)
 Les Étrangères (1876)
 L’Enseignement supérieur à Genève depuis la fondation de l’Académie depuis le 5 juin 1559 (1878)
 Jean-Jacques Rousseau jugé par les Genevois d’aujourd’hui (1879)
 Jour à jour (1880)
 Fragments d’un journal intime (1884), 2nd ed.
  Amiel's Journal: The Journal Intime of Henri-Frédéric Amiel (1885),   trans. by Mrs. Humphry Ward. Description and preview. Macmillan.
 Philine (1927)
 Lettres de jeunesse (1904)
 Essais, critiques (1931)

See also 
 Henri-Frédéric Amiel - Wikiquote (external link)

References

Further reading
 Arnold, Matthew (1888). "Amiel." In: Essays in Criticism. London: Macmillan & Co., pp. 300–331.
 Barry, William (1909). "An Apostle of Nirvana: H.F. Amiel." In: Heralds of Revolt. London: Hodder & Stoughton, pp. 102–119.
 Brooks, Van Wyck (1913). "Amiel." In: The Malady of the Ideal. London: A.C. Fifield, pp. 81–103.
 Pater, Walter (1901). "Amiel's 'Journal Intime'." In: Essays from 'The Guardian'. London: Macmillan & Co., pp. 17–37.
 Ward, Mary A. (1921). Introduction to Amiel's Journal. London: Macmillan & Co., pp. vii–xliii.

External links

 
  
 Works by Henry Frédéric Amiel at Hathi Trust
 
 www.amiel.org/atelier/ website in French dedicated to Henri-Frédéric Amiel

1821 births
1881 deaths
Writers from Geneva
Swiss Protestants
Swiss writers in French
19th-century Swiss philosophers
19th-century Christian mystics
Protestant mystics
Christian poets
Philosophers of art
Protestant philosophers
Swiss diarists
Swiss people of French descent
Swiss poets in French
Swiss male poets
Swiss male writers
19th-century Swiss poets
19th-century male writers
19th-century diarists